Uyedineniya Island (also Uedinenia,) is an island located in the central part of the Kara Sea, roughly midway between Novaya Zemlya and Severnaya Zemlya. Its latitude is 77° 29' N and its longitude 82° 30' E. It is often labelled as Einsamkeit Island (from the German Insel der Einsamkeit) as well as Lonely Island or Solitude Island in English maps.

Geography
The island is barren and icy throughout the winter months, but some tundra vegetation grows on it in the summer. Compared to other Arctic islands it is flat and low-lying, with some swamps and small lakes and a long spit of land on its NE side.

Owing to its extreme northerly location the weather is bleak and severe and the sea surrounding Uedineniya is covered with pack ice in the winter. Ice floes are commonly found even in the summer.

Uyedineniya belongs to the Krasnoyarsk Krai administrative division of the Russian Federation.

History
The island was discovered on 26 August 1878 by Norwegian explorer Captain Edvard Holm Johannesen from Tromsø. He named the island Ensomheden—"solitude" in Norwegian—due to its desolate appearance and isolated location in the Arctic.

Soviet polar explorer Professor Vladimir Yulyevich Vize advanced the hypothesis that there was an extensive shallow area and perhaps more undiscovered islands near Uyedinenya. This was based on certain observations made by polar explorers:

During his expedition to Franz Josef Land on ice-breaking steamer "Malygin" in 1931, Vize hoped to carry out oceanographic work in the Northern part of the Kara Sea, but his research was cut short by thick sea ice. Later expeditions and satellite pictures demonstrated that there were no other islands in the vicinity of Uedineniya.

A cervical vertebra of a plesiosaur (Plesiosaurus latispinus) was discovered on the island during an expedition in the 1930s. It was studied by Soviet paleontologist A. N. Ryabinin.

At the time of World War II, there was a small polar observatory on Uyedineniya built by the Soviet government. On September 8, 1942, the German submarine U-251 (Lt. Captain Timm) surfaced close to the island and destroyed the weather station's small building and its garrison by firing grenades against those targets. This was one of the last actions of the Kriegsmarine under Operation Wunderland.

Since May 1993, Uyedineniya has been a part of the Great Arctic State Nature Reserve, the largest nature reserve in Russia intended to preserve the habitat of the polar bears, pinnipeds (namely, walruses and seals), and the many kinds of birds that live on the island.

The polar observatory, which had been rebuilt during the Cold War time, was abandoned in 1996. Presently there is no human habitation in Uyedineniya.

Climate
Uyedineniya Island has a harsh Arctic climate, mean temperatures never rise above freezing.

See also
 List of islands of Russia
 List of research stations in the Arctic

Notes

References

Sources
 Rudolf Samoylovich, Exploration of the Polar Part of U.S.S.R. in 1934 and the Sedov expedition.
 Albert Hastings Markham. Arctic Exploration, 1895.

External links
 Hamradio
 Sverdrup Expedition investigations on Uyedinenya Island

Islands of the Kara Sea
Exploration of the Arctic
Polar exploration by Russia and the Soviet Union
Populated places of Arctic Russia
Islands of Krasnoyarsk Krai
Arctic expeditions